Marianne Burgman (14 May 1953 – 15 May 2021) was a Dutch politician. A member of the People's Party for Freedom and Democracy, she served as Mayor of Maarn, Bunnik, and De Ronde Venen.

Biography
Burgman became Mayor of Maarn in 1995 and served until 2002, when the municipality was merged into Utrechtse Heuvelrug. She was Acting Mayor of Bunnik from 1 April to 1 November 2000 before becoming Mayor of De Ronde Venen in 2002. She began serving as Acting Mayor in 2011, during the merger between De Ronde Venen and Abcoude.

Marianne Burgman died on 15 May 2021 at the age of 68 following a short illness.

References

Further reading
 W. Jong and R.H. Johannink, Als dat maar goed gaat, Bestuurlijke ervaringen met crises, 2005,  (in-depth interview)

1953 births
2021 deaths
Dutch women in politics
Mayors of places in the Netherlands
Dutch politicians
People's Party for Freedom and Democracy politicians
People from Maarn
People from Bunnik
People from De Ronde Venen